Geostorm is a 2017 American science fiction disaster film directed, co-written, and co-produced by Dean Devlin (in his feature directorial debut). The film stars Gerard Butler, Jim Sturgess, Abbie Cornish, Ed Harris, and Andy García. It follows a satellite designer who tries to save the world from a storm of epic proportions caused by malfunctioning climate-controlling satellites.

Principal photography began on October 20, 2014, in New Orleans, Louisiana. After poor test screenings, re-shoots took place in December 2016 under executive producer Jerry Bruckheimer, writer Laeta Kalogridis and new director Danny Cannon. To date, the film is the only co-production between Skydance Media and Warner Bros.

Geostorm was released in the United States on October 20, 2017, in all formats, and heavily underperformed at the box office, grossing only $221 million worldwide against a $120 million budget and losing Warner Bros. $74 million. The film received highly negative reviews, notably for its storytelling and visual effects.

Plot

In 2019, following many catastrophic natural disasters, an international coalition commissions a system of climate-controlling satellites called "Dutch Boy". After it neutralizes a typhoon in Shanghai, a US Senate sub-committee reprimands chief architect Jake Lawson because he brought Dutch Boy online without authorization. He is replaced by his brother Max, who works under US Secretary of State Leonard Dekkom.

Three years later, a UN team stationed in the Registan Desert discovers a frozen village. Makmoud Habib, an Indian engineer working on the International Climate Space Station (ICSS), copies data from the satellite responsible for Afghanistan onto a hard drive before he is killed in a supposed accident. 

After convincing U.S President Andrew Palma to conduct an investigation, Max persuades Jake to go to the ICSS to investigate. In Hong Kong, a satellite severely increases city temperatures and causes fire whirls and the collapse of multiple buildings.

Jake arrives at the ICSS to examine the malfunctioning satellites, which were damaged and their data erased. He works with station commander Ute Fassbinder and her crew, consisting of engineer Eni Adisa, systems specialist Duncan Taylor, technician Al Hernandez, and security officer Ray Dussette. They recover the hard drive but hide it from the crew, suspecting a traitor. Examining the data leads to the discovery that a computer virus has been introduced, causing the malfunctions and has wiped out the login access of key senior people to the satellite. 

Suspecting Palma is using Dutch Boy as a weapon, Jake tells Max he needs to reboot the system to eliminate the virus, requiring the kill code held by Palma. The ICSS staff neutralize malfunctioning satellites by deliberately knocking them offline via collisions with replacement ones.

Back on Earth, Cheng Long discovers that he and Max have lost login access and warns Max of a global cataclysm known as a "Geostorm" if the malfunction continues. Cheng is pursued to Washington, D.C. by a team of rogue government agents, who kill him in a traffic incident, but not before he says "Zeus." 

Discovering Project Zeus simulates extreme weather patterns to create a Geostorm, Max enlists his girlfriend, Secret Service agent Sarah Wilson, to acquire the code. During this time, the ICSS team loses control of all operations as the virus initiates the self-destruct program.

During the DNC in Orlando, Florida, Max discovers Orlando is next to be targeted after a massive hailstorm hits Tokyo and an offshore cold snap takes out a portion of Rio de Janeiro. Max requests Dekkom's help, who instead unsuccessfully tries to kill him, revealing himself as the saboteur.

Max immediately informs Sarah, so they kidnap Palma to protect him from Dekkom's agents and secure the kill code. As they escape from the arena before a lightning storm destroys it, Max discloses their activities and Dekkom's treachery to Palma. After outsmarting Dekkom's mercenaries, the three arrest Dekkom and confront him about his plan to eliminate the other elected officials in America's line of succession, allowing him to dominate the world while eliminating America's enemies. Max and Sarah escort Palma to the Kennedy Space Center, where they transmit the code but learn that the self-destruct sequence cannot be stopped.

More disasters strike around the world (including tornadoes in Mumbai, a major heatwave in Moscow, and a megatsunami in Dubai). Jake realizes Duncan is the traitor who masterminded Habib's death and created the storms on Dekkom's orders and confronts him. 

Duncan reveals that he's doing it for the big paycheck from Dekkom as he receives a meager salary as a software engineer. Jake mocks him for his foolishness as if he does not stop the Geostorm, there will be nothing left on Earth for him to spend his millions. But Duncan sadistically states that he is curious to see how the world would end. 

Jake escapes in the ensuing confrontation, and Duncan accidentally ejects himself into space. As the crew evacuates the station, Jake and Ute stay behind to ensure the system's reboot, eliminating the virus and transferring satellite control to NASA, thus preventing the Geostorm at the last second.

They then escape in a replacement satellite, where they take shelter as the self-destruct sequence completes. They use the replacement satellite's thrusters as a beacon, and a nearby shuttle piloted by Hernandez picks them up.

Six months later, Jake is working as the head engineer for Dutch Boy once more, now administered by an international committee.

Cast
 Gerard Butler as Jake Lawson, a satellite designer, former ICSS commander, and Hannah's father 
 Jim Sturgess as Assistant Secretary of State Max Lawson, Jake's younger brother and Hannah's uncle
 Abbie Cornish as U.S. Secret Service Agent Sarah Wilson, Max's fiancée
 Alexandra Maria Lara as Ute Fassbinder, the commander of the space station and DLR Astronaut
 Ed Harris as U.S. Secretary of State Leonard Dekkom
 Andy García as U.S. President Andrew Palma
 Richard Schiff as Virginia Senator Thomas Cross
 Robert Sheehan as Duncan Taylor, a British crew member of the ICSS and UKSA Astronaut
 Eugenio Derbez as Al Hernandez, a Mexican crew member of the ICSS and AEM Astronaut
 Adepero Oduye as Eni Adisa, a Nigerian crew member of the ICSS and NASRDA Astronaut
 Amr Waked as Ray Dussette, a French crew member of the ICSS and CNES Astronaut
 Daniel Wu as Cheng Long, the Hong Kong-based supervisor for the Dutch Boy Program
 Zazie Beetz as Dana, a cybersecurity expert, and good friends with Max
 Talitha Bateman as Hannah Lawson, Jake's daughter and Max's niece. She is the beginning and end narrator of the film.
 Billy Slaughter as Karl Dright
 Tom Choi as Chinese Representative Lee
 Mare Winningham as Dr. Jennings
 Jeremy Ray Taylor as Emmett
 Gregory Alan Williams as General Montgaff
 Drew Powell as Chris Campbell

Katheryn Winnick had been cast as Olivia Lawson, Jake's ex-wife and the mother of Hannah, but during reshoots, her role was recast with Julia Denton.

Production
As Dean Devlin explained climate change to his daughter Hannah, she asked why a machine could not be built to fix that. Devlin went on to imagine such a thing, and how it could be used for evil purposes. As he struggled to develop his script, he asked the help of Paul Guyot, specially to write the brother dynamics. In 2013, Skydance Productions purchased the filming rights. After Skydance's distributing partner Paramount Pictures put the project into turnaround, Geostorm was pitched and accepted by Warner Bros. Pre-production began on July 7, 2014.  With an initial budget of $82 million, principal photography began on October 20, 2014, in New Orleans, Louisiana, and lasted through February 10, 2015. Filming began on Loyola Avenue on the first day. Some NASA scenes were filmed at a NASA Rocket Factory in New Orleans in November 2014 and January 2015.

After poor test screenings in December 2015, $15 million reshoots were conducted in Louisiana in early December 2016, under new producer Jerry Bruckheimer, writer Laeta Kalogridis and director Danny Cannon. Winnick's role was recast with Julia Denton during reshoots, while new characters were added into the script.

Marketing
On October 16, 2017, Warner Bros. released a promotional video on its YouTube channel. In the video, a New York taxicab outfitted with hidden cameras drives onto a street apparently affected by an ice storm, much to the shock of its unwitting passengers.

Release
The film was originally set for release on March 25, 2016, but in August 2014, Warner set this date for the release of Batman v Superman: Dawn of Justice instead. On December 11, 2014, WB shifted its live-action animated film Mowgli to 2017 and gave its previous date from March 25, 2016, then October 21, 2016, to Geostorm. In September 2015, the studio again moved back the film from October 21, 2016, to January 13, 2017. In June 2016, the studio announced the release had been moved back from January 13, 2017, to October 20, 2017. The film had an IMAX 3D release.

Home media
Geostorm was released on DVD, Blu-ray and Blu-ray 3D on January 16, 2018.

Reception

Box office
Geostorm grossed $33.7 million in the United States and Canada, and $187.7 million in other territories, for a worldwide total of $221.4 million, against a production budget of $120 million. Box office analysts estimated that the film needed to gross $300–350 million worldwide in order to break even.

In North America, the film was released alongside Boo 2! A Madea Halloween, The Snowman and Only the Brave, and was expected to gross $10–12 million from 3,246 theaters in its opening weekend. After not holding Thursday night preview screenings, the film made $4.2 million on Friday. It went on to debut to $13.3 million, finishing second at the box office. The week after its release, it was reported the film would likely lose the studio around $100 million. In March 2018, Deadline Hollywood calculated the film lost Warner Bros. $71.6 million, when factoring together all expenses and revenues.

Critical response
On Rotten Tomatoes, the film holds an approval rating of 17% based on 93 reviews, with an average rating of 3.60/10. The site's critical consensus read, "Lacking impressive visuals, well-written characters, or involving drama, Geostorm aims for epic disaster-movie spectacle but ends up simply being a disaster of a movie." On Metacritic, the film had a weighted average score of 21 out of 100, based on reviews from 22 critics, indicating "generally unfavorable reviews". Audiences polled by CinemaScore gave the film an average grade of "B−" on an A+ to F scale, while PostTrak reported filmgoers gave it a 67% overall positive score and a 49% "definite recommend".

TheWrap gave the film a negative review and stated, "Disaster movies might have just flatlined with director and co-writer Dean Devlin's chaotically stupid bid to emulate his old partner, catastrophe peddler Roland Emmerich." Matt Singer of ScreenCrush gave the film 2 out of 10, calling the film a "slog, but the final act achieves a kind of transcendent idiocy." Peter Debruge of Variety gave the film a negative review and stated, "The only thing more reliable than bad weather is bad movies, and in that respect, Geostorm is right on forecast." A. O. Scott of The New York Times gave the film a negative review and stated, "Geostorm uses digital technology to lay waste to a bunch of cities and hacky screenwriting to assault the dignity of several fine actors." Peter Sobczynski of RogerEbert.com gave the film 1.5 out of 4 and stated that Geostorm "really could have used a Sharknado or two to liven things up."

The Arizona Republic gave the film 2 out of 5 and criticized its lack of "exciting action", "chintzy visuals", and "without enough Gerald to go around". Entertainment Weekly gave the film a 'D' score and sarcastically summarized the film as "a bunch of supposedly connected scenes that don't seem to even know each other and were maybe shot years apart." Mike D'Angelo of The A.V. Club gave the film a score of 'D+' and praised its "15 minutes worth of impressive annihilation", but criticized its "dramatic monotony". Anna Smith of Time Out gave the film 2 out of 5 and found it to be "appealing to scientists looking for a good laugh." Los Angeles Times praised its "clever premise", but cited its result as "mostly dull-witted". The Guardian gave the film 2 out of 5 and remarked that audiences "have been sold a false bill of goods." Donald Clarke of The Irish Times gave the film 2 out of 5 and stated, "Geostorm feels like the sequel to a slightly better, slightly more expensive, significantly more Tom Cruisey film that made all its money in foreign-language territories."

The Hollywood Reporter gave the film a negative review and stated, "Big, dumb and boring, [Geostorm] finds the co-writer of Independence Day hoping to start a directing career with the same playbook - but forgetting several rules of the game." Robbie Collin of The Daily Telegraph gave the film 1 out of 5 and stated, "Watching Gerard Butler solve a whodunit is like watching ... chimpanzees move a piano downstairs: a kind of teeth-baring, flea-picking burlesque of recognizable human behavior that's funny for a while until you start to worry about the ethics of it." Alissa Wilkinson of Vox gave the film 0.5 out of 5 and stated, "The level of boredom I experienced during Geostorm ought to qualify as at least a second-degree felony in the state of New York." Mark Kermode of Kermode & Mayo's Film Review gave the film a negative review and stated, "It is the kind of film in which having a British accent will get you punched in the face, but the fact that Gerald Butler talks like Sean Connery in that weird sequence from The Untouchables? Nobody cares." Empire Magazine gave the film 2 out of 5 and called it "not quite the geostinker people were expecting, but the outlook is far from favorable."

See also
 List of films featuring space stations
 The Day After Tomorrow - a 2004 film with a similar premise from Devlin’s longtime collaborator Roland Emmerich

References

External links

 
 

2017 action thriller films
2010s disaster films
2017 science fiction films
2017 3D films
2017 films
American action thriller films
American disaster films
American science fiction action films
American science fiction thriller films
American survival films
Apocalyptic films
Dune Entertainment films
Environmental films
Films about brothers
Films about fictional presidents of the United States
Films about NASA
Films about technology
Films about tsunamis
Films set in 2019
Films set in 2022
Films set in the future
Films set in Afghanistan
Films set in Africa
Films set in Atlanta
Films set in Berlin
Films set in Dubai
Films set in Florida
Films set in Hong Kong
Films set in London
Films set in Madrid
Films set in Moscow
Films set in Mumbai
Films set in New York City
Films set in Orlando, Florida
Films set in Paris
Films set in Rio de Janeiro (city)
Films set in Seoul
Films set in Shanghai
Films set in Sydney
Films set in Taiwan
Films set in Tokyo
Films set in Toronto
Films set in outer space
Films set in the White House
Films shot in Colorado
Films shot in Florida
Films shot in New Orleans
Fiction about government
IMAX films
Malware in fiction
Skydance Media films
Warner Bros. films
Films scored by Lorne Balfe
2017 directorial debut films
Films about the United States Secret Service
4DX films
2010s English-language films
Climate change films
2010s American films